Cassidy Marie Wolf (born July 5, 1994) is an American TV host, model and beauty queen who was crowned Miss Teen USA 2013.

Pageants
While attending Great Oak High School in Temecula, she was crowned Miss Greater San Diego Teen USA. Wolf was crowned Miss California Teen USA in 2013, and later the same year Miss Teen USA 2013 on August 10, 2013, in The Bahamas. Wolf was crowned the 31st Miss Teen USA. She was first Runner-Up at Miss California Teen USA 2012.

Victim of sextortion
Wolf was a victim of sextortion, after photographs of her were hacked and used in an attempt to blackmail her. The FBI ran a probe after Wolf reported a threatening email demanding a 'special performance' for the hacker, who she suspected to be Jared James Abrahams, her former high school classmate. Wolf never created the video demanded, and on September 26, 2013, Abrahams surrendered to FBI agents in Orange County. In November 2013, Abrahams pleaded guilty to hacking over 100-150 women and installing the highly invasive malware Blackshades on their computers in order to obtain nude images and videos of them. One of his victims was a 14-year-old girl. On March 18, 2014; Abrahams was sentenced to 18 months in federal prison.

Achievements
Wolf was a semi-finalist for the Los Angeles Music Center Spotlight Awards and a Merit Recipient for the National Young Arts Foundation. She has also been awarded several talent scholarships to Joffrey Ballet in New York City and was invited to be part of the professional Trainee Jazz Program.

Career
Wolf was the co-host of Catfish: The TV Show on MTV for season 4 episode 2.

References

1994 births
Living people
2013 beauty pageant contestants
21st-century Miss Teen USA delegates
Miss Teen USA winners
People from Riverside, California